The General Mission of Palestine in Japan is the diplomatic mission of the Palestinian Authority in Japan. It is located in Chiyoda in Tokyo.

See also

List of diplomatic missions in Japan.
List of diplomatic missions of Palestine.

References

External links
 Official Website

Tokyo
Palestine
Japan–State of Palestine relations